Tamași is a commune in Bacău County, Western Moldavia, Romania. It is composed of three villages: Chetriș (Ketris), Furnicari (Furnikár) and Tamași. It included Gioseni village until 2005, when it was split off to form a separate commune.

Natives
 Lidia Drăgănescu

References

Communes in Bacău County
Localities in Western Moldavia